Panovci is a small settlement in the Municipality of Gornji Petrovci in the Prekmurje region of Slovenia.

References

External links
Panovci on Geopedia

Populated places in the Municipality of Gornji Petrovci